Hermon Hitson  Herman Hitson (born June 7, 1943) is an American guitarist from Atlanta, Georgia, United States. He has played with Garnet Mimms, Joe Tex, Bobby Womack, and Wilson Pickett. Hitson has also been at the center of the controversy over the disputed Hendrix "Free Spirit" track.

Background
Originally from Philadelphia, Pennsylvania, United States, Hitson grew up in Jacksonville, Florida. He formed the Sterophonics in 1959 which was his first band. at that time he only knew a few guitar chords but got the chance to play to the audience because his guitar player never turned up. Seeing a positive reaction from the audience he purchased a guitar the next day. After the Stereophonics finished he formed another band called The Rockin' Tonics. The first record he cut "Been So Long" / "Georgia Grind" on Royal Records was plugged by DJs and Hitson did quite well with it.

His song "Love Slipped Thru My Fingers" is a popular Northern Soul track.

In the late 1980s, Hitson, Freddie Terrell, and Raymond Smith formed Family Records Inc. The first artists they signed were Harrison Jones and The Voices of Harmony.

Among the musicians that have either backed or played with Hitson are the Mississippi-based guitarist J.D. Mark, who died in 2013, and The Lonely Lonely Knights. The Knights had also backed Filmore Slim, Chick Willis, and Ralph "Soul" Jackson.

Controversy
Regarding the controversy over "Free Spirit", questions are asked if Hitson is the actual player and singer on the track, or if it was actually Hendrix who played on it, also being unsure on who deserves the artist credit. Some tracks that may or may not actually feature Hendrix have Hitson, Lonnie Youngblood, and Lee Moses have playing on them. Some have been produced by John Brantley.

Later years
In 2005, Soul-Tay-Shus Records released You Are Too Much for the Human Heart which was a compilation of singles he recorded from 1961 to 1976. Peter Margasak, reviewer for the Chicago Reader stated that the material on the album ranged from Otis Redding styled songs to tracks similar to James Brown.

In August 2010, Herman Hitson and the Lonely Knights appeared at the Rock ’n’ Bowl in New Orleans.

Discography

References

External links
 Official website

1943 births
Living people
Guitarists from Philadelphia
American male guitarists
20th-century American guitarists
20th-century American male musicians